Grahana is a 1978 Indian Kannada drama film directed by T. S. Nagabharana.

At the 26th National Film Awards, the film was awarded the Best Feature Film on National Integration and Best Screenplay (T. S. Ranga and T. S. Nagabharana).

Cast
 Anand Pericharan as Puttaswamy Gowda
 G. K. Govinda Rao as Narase Gowda
 Malathi Rao as Narase Gowda's Wife

Awards and honors
National Film Awards 1978
 Best Film on National Integration
 Best Screenplay – T S Ranga, T S Nagabharana

Karnataka State Film Awards 1978-79
 First Best Film
 Best Cinematographer (B&W) – S. Ramachandra

References

1970s Kannada-language films
1978 films
Films scored by Vijaya Bhaskar
Films directed by T. S. Nagabharana
Films whose writer won the Best Original Screenplay National Film Award
Best Film on National Integration National Film Award winners
1978 directorial debut films